Amit Mahto is an Indian politician and the member of Jharkhand Legislative Assembly from Silli and won Vidhan Sabha election in 2014. He was a member of Jharkhand Mukti Morcha and considered the face of youth in Jharkhand Political Party. Former JMM MLA from Silli, Amit Mahto has resigned from the party, accused the leadership of compromising the interest of the people of Jharkhand and formed a new political Party Khatiyani Jharkhandi Party on 6 April 2022 to give rights to the local Khatiyani People of Jharkhand.

Early life 
Since childhood he was sagacious towards education and completed Bachelor of Engineering (civil) Birla Institute of Technology, Mesra, Ranchi in 2003.

Revolutionary 
During the school days he came under the influence of well renowned freedom fighter of the region Binod Bihari Mahato and Nirmal Mahto who gave him initiation and motivated towards the freedom struggle.

References 

Living people
Jharkhand Mukti Morcha politicians
Jharkhand politicians
Birla Institute of Technology, Mesra alumni
Year of birth missing (living people)